The 1982 Long Beach State 49ers football team represented California State University, Long Beach during the 1982 NCAA Division I-A football season.

Cal State Long Beach competed in the Pacific Coast Athletic Association. The team was led by sixth-year head coach Dave Currey, and played the majority of their home games at Anaheim Stadium in Anaheim, California, with one game at Veterans Stadium adjacent to the campus of Long Beach City College in Long Beach, California. They finished the season with a record of six wins, five losses (6–5, 5–1 PCAA).

Schedule

Team players in the NFL
No Long Beach State 49ers were selected in the 1983 NFL Draft.

The following finished their college career in 1982, were not drafted, but played in the NFL.

Notes

References

Long Beach State
Long Beach State 49ers football seasons
Long Beach State 49ers football